Tiryaki is a Turkish surname. Notable people with the surname include:

 Tiryaki Hasan Pasha, Turkish military leader
 Ayşe Olcay Tiryaki, Turkish physician
 Cansu Tiryaki, Turkish female football referee
 Mustafa Tiryaki, Turkish footballer

Turkish-language surnames